Han Gerard Hoekstra (4 September 1906 – 15 April 1988)  was a Dutch poet, best known for his children's literature.

Early life and education

He was born in The Hague, South Holland, Netherlands.

Career

Awards
Hoekstra won numerous awards throughout his career, including the 1972 Constantijn Huygens Prize, an annual Dutch literary award.

Death
He died, age 81, in Amsterdam, North Holland, Netherlands.

See also

 List of children's literature authors
 List of Dutch poets

External links
Database (undated).  "Han G. Hoekstra" (in Dutch).  Digital Library for Dutch Literature.  Retrieved 25 February 2011.

1906 births
1988 deaths
20th-century Dutch poets
20th-century Dutch male writers
Constantijn Huygens Prize winners
Dutch children's writers
Dutch male poets
Writers from Amsterdam
Writers from The Hague